Fougeré is a commune in the Vendée department in the Pays de la Loire region in western France.

Education
The commune has one public elementary school, Ecole Jacques Prévert, and a private school, Ecole Saint-Joseph.

See also
Communes of the Vendée department

References

External links

 Home page 

Communes of Vendée
Vendée communes articles needing translation from French Wikipedia